Aleksandar Luković (Serbian Cyrillic: Александар Луковић; born 23 October 1982) is a Serbian football manager and a former player who played as a defender. He is the manager of Serbia national under-17 football team. He appeared in the 2010 World Cup.

Club career

Early career
Luković started his career at hometown club Sloga Kraljevo. In 2002, he was signed by Crvena Zvezda. He played his first UEFA Cup match on 15 August 2002 after he substituted Nemanja Vidić at second half. Crvena Zvezda won 2–0 to FC Kairat.

Udinese
In mid-2006, after signing a pre-contract with Udinese, Luković was on loan to Ascoli from Red Star Belgrade in order for the club to "borrow" the non-EU registration quota of Ascoli for Udinese. He was "loaned" to Udinese from Ascoli in January transfer window.

On 27 January 2007, he played his first Serie A match for Udinese against Torino.

He was signed permanently in mid-2007 by Udinese from Red Star.

Zenit St. Petersburg
On 29 July 2010, it was officially announced that Luković signed a four-year contract with FC Zenit Saint Petersburg for undisclosed fee. Initially he was a constant starter for the team but eventually got reduced playing time with the arrival of Domenico Criscito to the club for left-back position.

Return to Red Star Belgrade
After several consecutive transfer windows of rumors regarding his return, it was announced on 29 December 2014 that Luković signed a 2.5-year contract with Red Star. On 6 February 2015, in a friendly match against Rubin Kazan, Luković suffered a serious injury which sidelined him until the summer of 2015. On 23 August 2015, Luković finally made his first appearance for Red Star since his injury, and was applauded by the whole stadium when he came in as a substitute for Savo Pavićević. After the end of contract with club in summer 2017, Luković left the club as a free agent. In July same year, Luković retired from playing football professionally.

International career
He made his international debut against Poland on 15 August 2005. He played a part during 2010 World Cup qualifying and mostly partnered Nemanja Vidić in central defense as Aleksandar Kolarov was preferred at left back. 

In June 2010, he was selected in Serbia's squad for the 2010 FIFA World Cup,  where he appeared in group stage matches against Ghana and Australia. He was sent off in Serbia's opening match against Ghana on 13 June 2010.

In March 2011, two weeks before a crucial Euro 2012 qualifier against Northern Ireland, Luković surprised everyone by deciding to retire from the national team at the age of 28, choosing to focus on his club Zenit. On the same occasion, his teammate Danko Lazović also made the same announcement.

Career statistics

Club
Source:

International
Source:

Honours

Club
Red Star Belgrade
Serbian SuperLiga (2): 2005–06, 2015–16
Serbian Cup (2): 2001–02, 2005–06

Zenit St. Petersburg
Russian Premier League (2): 2010, 2011–12
Russian Super Cup (1): 2011

Individual
 Serbian SuperLiga Team of the Season: 2015–16

References

External links

 
 
 
 

Serbian footballers
Serbian football managers
Serbian expatriate footballers
Serbia and Montenegro international footballers
Serbia international footballers
Expatriate footballers in Italy
FK Sloga Kraljevo players
FK Jedinstvo Ub players
Red Star Belgrade footballers
Ascoli Calcio 1898 F.C. players
Udinese Calcio players
FC Zenit Saint Petersburg players
Serie A players
Serbian SuperLiga players
Association football fullbacks
Association football central defenders
Sportspeople from Kraljevo
1982 births
Living people
2010 FIFA World Cup players
Russian Premier League players
Expatriate footballers in Russia
Serbian expatriate sportspeople in Italy
Serbian expatriate sportspeople in Russia
Serbia and Montenegro footballers
FC Zenit-2 Saint Petersburg players